A Free Woman is a 1954 Italian melodrama film directed by Vittorio Cottafavi. In 2008, the film was selected to enter the list of the 100 Italian films to be saved.

Plot

Cast 
 Françoise Christophe as Liana Franci
 Pierre Cressoy as  Gerardo Villabruna
Gino Cervi as  Massimo Marchi
Elisa Cegani as  Madre di Liana
Lianella Carell as  Solange
Christine Carère as  Leonora Franci
Galeazzo Benti as  Sergio Rollini

References

External links

1954 films
Films directed by Vittorio Cottafavi
1954 drama films
Italian drama films
Italian black-and-white films
Melodrama films
1950s Italian films